Weiron Valfrid Holmberg (born 18 March 1935) is a Swedish actor. He has appeared in more than 20 films and television shows since 1978.

Filmography

References

External links

1935 births
Living people
20th-century Swedish male actors
21st-century Swedish male actors
Swedish male film actors
Swedish male television actors
People from Gothenburg